Taranis moerchii is a species of sea snail, a marine gastropod mollusk in the family Raphitomidae.

Description
The length of the shell varies between 2 mm and 4 mm.

The two specimens from station 2077, in 1255 fathoms, are somewhat stouter than those previously obtained, and have the principal carina, forming the shoulder, larger and more prominent than usual, but it bears only very minute tubercles, corresponding to the very fine and close riblets which cross the wide and abruptly sloping subsutural 
band obliquely, and are about twice as numerous and much finer than in the ordinary variety. On the body whorl there are about six prominent, distant, revolving cinguli below the shoulder, besides some faint ones on the base of the siphonal canal. The space between the uppermost of these and the shoulder-carina is greater than usual. The lines of growth are much finer than in the ordinary form and do not take the appearance of riblets on the body whorl, nor do they render the cinguli nodulous. The suture is sharply impressed, and the raised revolving line usually present just below the suture is absent. This form, therefore, is characterized by the relative predominance of the spiral sculpture over the transverse, and by the absence of distinct nodules at the crossing of the two systems of lines.  (described as Taranis moerchii var. tornata)

Distribution
This marine species occurs off the Faroes; Northern Norway to the Mediterranean Sea.

References

 Malm, A.W. (1861). [E]n Raekke af Fiske, Krebsdyr og Bløddyr, som ere nye for den skandinaviske Fauna, og meddeelte de nedenanførte Bemaerkninger om disse Arter. Forhandlinger ved de Skandinaviske Naturforskeres, 8: 616–624. Forhandlinger ved de Skandinaviske Naturforskeres. 8: 616-624
 Brugnone, G.A. (1862) Memoria sopra alcuni pleurotomi fossili dei dintorni di Palermo. F. Lao, Palermo, 41 pp., 1 pl.
 Sturany R. (1896). Zoologische Ergebnisse VII. Mollusken I (Prosobranchier und Opisthobranchier; Scaphopoden; Lamellibranchier) gesammelt von S.M. Schiff "Pola" 1890-1894. Denkschriften der Kaiserlichen Akademie der Wissenschaften, Mathematische-Naturwissenschaftlischen Classe, 63: 1-36, pl.1-2
 Gofas, S.; Le Renard, J.; Bouchet, P. (2001). Mollusca. in: Costello, M.J. et al. (eds), European Register of Marine Species: a check-list of the marine species in Europe and a bibliography of guides to their identification. Patrimoines Naturels. 50: 180-213.

External links
 Biolib.cz : Taranis moerchii
 Gastropods.com: Taranis moerchii
 
 Tiberi, N. (1868). Nova Mediterranea testacea. Journal de Conchyliologie. 16: 179-180
 Locard A. (1897-1898). Expéditions scientifiques du Travailleur et du Talisman pendant les années 1880, 1881, 1882 et 1883. Mollusques testacés. Paris, Masson. vol. 1 [1897, p. 1-516 pl. 1-22; vol. 2 [1898], p. 1-515, pl. 1-18]
  Census of Marine Life (2012). SYNDEEP: Towards a first global synthesis of biodiversity, biogeography and ecosystem function in the deep sea. Unpublished data (datasetID: 20)
 Dyntaxa. (2013). Swedish Taxonomic Database.
 Check List of European Marine Mollusca (CLEMAM)

moerchii
Gastropods described in 1861